Tipula vernalis is a species of cranefly found in the West Palaearctic.

References

 

Tipulidae
Diptera of Europe
Insects described in 1804
Taxa named by Johann Wilhelm Meigen